Валинке is a national folklore ensemble of riding Chuvashs of Alikovsky District of the Chuvash Republic. It is part of a collection of about 60 masters of national art creativity.

The leader is Lydia Vasilevna Filippova, the director of Alikovsky palace of culture.

The creative collective of the Chuvash song and dance includes three age groups: seniors, adult and children. The grpi[ omc;ides teachers, schoolboys, doctors, pensioners and art workers.

Performers use traditional costumes and musical instruments, such aspalnai, nai, khupkhu, tutut, caval and parappan which bring unique color.

Their repertoire includes "Snowdrops" (Çеçпĕлсем) lullabies, game songs, dances, chastooshkas and fairy tales. They also participate in ceremonies and on holidays. The children's group has received awards at festivals «Черчен чечексем» («Beauty flowers») and «Пĕчĕк çеç путене» ("Perepelochka").

History
From 1995 to 2001, Alina Afanaseva, graduate of folklore branch of Cheboksary musical school, supervised. The same year "Valinke" participated in "Between Volga and Don" festival.

In 2000 Valinke showed their skills at the Festival of Chuvash culture in the Orenburg region.

In 2006–2008 the group performed in Moscow, Volgograd, Saratov, Kirov, Bogorodsk (Nizhniy Novgorod region), Bashkortostan and Tatarstan.

On June 25–27, 2010 Valinke went to the village Lyuk of the Zavyalovsky District of the Udmurt Republic (native land of ethnographologist and folklorist D.K. Zelenin) for participation in the 5th Interregional folklore festival «A window in the sky».

In 2011 the group visited a holiday of "Чӳклеме" (Immolation) at the invitation of the Chuvash national-cultural autonomy of Krasnoyarsk Region. They also gave concerts in Tyumen and Ekaterinburg.

Achievements
Received diploma of the 2nd degree, 5th All-Russia festival of folklore collectives: "Crystal key", August 2008, Bogorodsk (Nizhny Novgorod Region).
Took part in many festivals — «Springs of Russia», «Between Sura and Tsivil», «Ancient patterns», also in republican "Akatuy"
Receives guests of annually conducted Interregional festival of the Chuvash variety music Virjyal the shevlisy.
The children's group earned festival  awards at «Черчен чечексем» («Flowers of Chuvashiya») and ««Пĕчĕк çеç путене»» ("Perepelochka").

See also
Alikovo middle school
On the life’s way

Literature
"Аликовская энциклопедия", educated: Ефимов Л.А., Ефимов Е.Л., Ананьев А. А., Терентьев Г. К., Cheboksary, 2009, .

External links
 Valinke, information
 НАРОДНЫЙ ФОЛЬКЛОРНЫЙ АНСАМБЛЬ «ВАЛИНКЕ» 
 Народный фольклорный ансамбль "Валинке"
 Народный фольклорный коллектив «Валинкке» выступил на национальном празднике «Акатуй» в Санкт-Петербурге

Alikovsky District
Culture of Chuvashia
Chuvash culture